Tumiditarsus cicatricornis is a species of beetle in the family Cerambycidae, the only species in the genus Tumiditarsus.

References

Eburiini